Daniel Jorge (born 26 May 1959) is a Uruguayan rower. He competed in the men's coxed pair event at the 1972 Summer Olympics.

References

1959 births
Living people
Uruguayan male rowers
Olympic rowers of Uruguay
Rowers at the 1972 Summer Olympics
Place of birth missing (living people)